TVN24 is a Polish 24-hour commercial news channel, launched on 9 August 2001. Being a part of the TVN Network, TVN24 has been owned since July 2017 by US-based media company Warner Bros. Discovery.  It gained broader popularity after the September 11, 2001 attacks in the US, which was the first major incident to be covered by TVN24. It is available over all digital platforms in Poland (Cyfrowy Polsat and nc+) as well as in most cable networks and some networks in other countries, including USA (Dish Network) and Germany. The audio portion of the channel can be streamed on the internet.

Launched on 30 November 2012, TVN24 is the longest-established HD news channel in Poland and East-Central Europe.

The TVN24 team is also responsible for the TVN flagship newscast, Fakty TVN. During major events (most recently September 11 attacks, Pope John Paul II's death and the Polish presidential plane crash), TVN24 is transmitted by TVN which has much wider broadcast range.

On 6 February 2018, the European Commission approved the Discovery (now Warner Bros. Discovery) acquisition deal. Since Liberty Global, which operates pay television services in Poland under the UPC Polska brand, is a major shareholder in Discovery Inc, EU competition law required that Discovery ensures the continued availability of TVN24 and TVN24 BiS to third-party TV providers.

Online 
TVN24 debuted its news website tvn24.pl on 19 March 2007.

TVN24 HD 
A one of TVN's planned channel is a TVN24 HD. Test & official start of the TVN24 HD started on 30 November 2012.

Editorial stance and reception
TVN24 tends to be strongly critical of the Polish government under the Law and Justice (PiS) party. Historian and columnist Timothy Garton Ash has praised Fakty TVN, writing that it is far more professional than Telewizja Polska's (TVP) Wiadomości (News). Ash wrote in 2019: "The Facts is not BBC-style impartial: it clearly favours a more liberal, pro-European Poland and is strongly anti-PiS. But unlike the so-called News, it is still definitely professional, high quality, reality-based journalism."

References

External links
 Official Site 

24-hour television news channels
Television channels in Poland
TVN (Polish TV channel)
Polish news websites